Les Derniers Jours de Charles Baudelaire ("the last days of Charles Baudelaire") is a 1988 novel by the French writer Bernard-Henri Lévy, about the life of the poet Charles Baudelaire.

The book was awarded the 1988 Prix Interallié. It was the runner-up for the Prix Goncourt the same year, having lost in the sixth voting round with four votes against five for Érik Orsenna's L'Exposition coloniale.

References

External links
 Presentation at the publisher's website 

1988 French novels
Biographical novels
Éditions Grasset books
French-language novels
Cultural depictions of Charles Baudelaire
Novels about writers
Novels set in the 19th century